Kogutud teosed. 1981–1993. Teine osa. (Collected works. Second part.) is a compilation album by Estonian rock musician Urmas Alender, coupled with Kogutud teosed. 1968-1980. Esimene osa.. The album was produced by Alender's daughter Yoko.

Track listing
 "Kevade" (Spring) (Urmas Alender/Marje Teslon) - 3:03 (1984)
 "Minu Eestimaa" (My Estonia) (Urmas Alender/Ülle Niinemägi) - 2:22 (1982)
 "Sõnad su suust" (Words from your mouth) (Urmas Alender/Marje Teslon) - 3:01 (1984)
 "Küll ma ootasin sind" (roughly Oh how I waited for you) (Urmas Alender/Hando Runnel) - 2:30 (1984)
 "Inimese loom" (Human animal) (Urmas Alender/Urmas Alender) - 3:48 (1982)
 "Meenutus" (Recollection) (Urmas Alender/Ott Arder) - 3:48 (1989)
 "Lauluke" (Ditty) (Urmas Alender/Ott Arder) - 2:12 (1989)
 "Üks väike rõõm" (A little joy) (Urmas Alender) - 3:40 (1992)
 "Üksikutele" (To the lonely) (Urmas Alender/Urmas Alender) - 4:33 (1993)
 "Tunne" (Feeling) (Urmas Alender/Urmas Alender) - 1:45 (1990)
 "Kui mind enam ei ole" (When I'm not around anymore) (Urmas Alender/Urmas Alender) - 3:01 (1993)
 "Ma näen sind taas" (I see you again) (Urmas Alender/Urmas Alender) - 2:38 (1982)
 "Imetlen sind" (I admire you) (Urmas Alender/Urmas Alender) - 2:56 (1982)
 "Sügiselaul" (Autumn song) (Urmas Alender/Urmas Alender) - 3:40 (1981)
 "Millest sa unistad?" (What are you dreaming of?) (Urmas Alender/Ülle Niinemägi) - 3:56 (1982)
 "Kui kaua veel?" (How much longer?) (Urmas Alender/Urmas Alender) - 2:39 (1981)
 "Kui ma enesesse tõmbun" (When I withdraw into myself) (Urmas Alender/Hando Runnel) - 3:03 (1980)
 "Usaldus" (Trust) (Urmas Alender/Urmas Alender) - 3:52 (1992)
 "Sa ütlesid: näkku ei lööda" (You said: no hitting in the face) (Urmas Alender/Virve Osila) - 2:16 (1993)
 "Solaarne" (Solar) (Urmas Alender/Virve Osila) - 3:03 (1993)

Urmas Alender albums
2000 compilation albums
Estonian-language albums